Mahindra Electric Mobility Limited, formerly known as the Reva Electric Car Company, is an Indian company based in Bangalore, involved in designing and manufacturing of compact electric vehicles. The company's first vehicle was the REVAi electric car, available in 26 countries with more than 4,000 of its different versions sold worldwide by mid-March 2011. Reva was acquired by Indian conglomerate Mahindra & Mahindra in May 2010. After the acquisition, the company launched the electric hatchback e2o in 2013. Today, the company sells electric vehicles in different segments – the electric sedan eVerito, the electric commercial vehicle eSupro (passenger and cargo), and the Treo range of low maintenance, lithium-ion battery-powered three-wheelers. Recently, Mahindra Electric became the first Indian car manufacturer to cross 170 million kilometers traveled on its fleet.

History

The Reva Electric Car Company (RECC) was founded in 1994 by Chetan Maini, as a joint venture between the Maini Group of Bangalore and Amerigon Electric Vehicle Technologies (AEVT Inc.) of the US. The company's sole aim was to develop and produce an affordable compact electric car. Several other automakers were also aiming to do so, but in 2001 RECC launched the REVA.

REVA was an acronym for "Revolutionary Electric Vehicle Alternative".

RECC joined up with several automotive experts to develop components for REVA. Curtis Instruments, Inc. of USA developed a Motor Controller specifically for the car. The car had a power pack for which Tudor India Limited supplied customized Prestolite batteries. The Charger for Reva was developed by Modular Power Systems of USA (a division of TDI Power). Later, RECC started manufacturing the charger themselves through a technical collaboration agreement between MPS and the Maini Group.

In 2004 GoinGreen of the UK entered into an agreement with RECC to import REVA cars and market them under the G-Wiz moniker.

In 2008 a revamped REVA model was launched called the REVAi. The company started production of a Lithium-ion variant called the REVA L-ion in 2009.

In 2009 at the Frankfurt Motor Show, Reva presented its future models Reva NXR and Reva NXG. During the event Reva and General Motors India declared a technical collaboration to develop affordable EV for the Indian market. As a result of this General Motors India announced an electric version of their hatchback in the New Delhi Auto Expo 2010: named the e-Spark, Reva was to provide battery technology.

On 26 May 2010, India's largest sports utility vehicles and tractor maker Mahindra & Mahindra bought a 55.2% controlling stake in Reva. Following the deal, the company was renamed Mahindra Reva Electric Vehicles Private Limited. Mahindra's president of an automotive business, Pawan Goenka, became the new company's chairman. As a result of the ownership change General Motors pulled out of the tie-up with Reva that was to produce the e-spark.

In Feb 2011 GoinGreen, the UK's exclusive importer of the G-Wiz, announced that it was no longer stocking the model (although it would order them on a 4-6-week lead time when requested by customers).

In 2016, the company was rebranded as Mahindra Electric Mobility Ltd. With the intention to reflect not just the business line of producing vehicles, but also developing powertrains and integrated mobility solutions.

Products

REVA and REVAi

Mahindra Reva currently produces two versions of the REVAi, an urban electric micro-car seating two adults and two children:

The REVA went on sale in India in 2001 and in the UK since 2003. The different versions of the REVA have sold more than 4,000 vehicles worldwide by mid March 2011 and is also available in the following countries: Bhutan, Brazil, Chile, Colombia, Costa Rica, Cyprus, France, Germany, Greece, Hungary, Iceland, Ireland, Japan, Malta, Monaco, Nepal, Norfolk Islands, Norway, Peru, the Philippines, Portugal, Spain, and Sri Lanka. The REVA is exempt from most European crash test rules, because its low weight and power registers it in the European "heavy quadricycle" category instead of the "car" category.

Mahindra e2o 

The Mahindra e2o, previously REVA NXR, is an urban electric car hatchback manufactured by the Mahindra Group. The e2o is the REVA G-Wiz successor and was developed using REVA's technology. The REVA NXR electric concept car was unveiled at the 2009 Frankfurt Motor Show. Export production was initially scheduled for 2012. Production was initially scheduled for late 2010 with deliveries slated for early 2011. The e2o was launched in India in March 2013 at a price of ₹5,96,000 after a 29% government subsidy granted by the state of Delhi. The e2o was also launched in Mumbai, Bangalore, Pune, Ahmedabad, Hyderabad, Chandigarh, and Kochi. Mahindra also launched the vehicle in the UK but later, in May 2017 withdrew from the market.

The product was eventually pulled from the market following the launch of its four-door successor.

e-Verito 
The e-Verito was launched in 2016 and was Mahindra's second electric car. Based on the normal Verito, which was an evolution of the Mahindra Renault joint venture Dacia Logan, it features a 21.2 kWh battery with a claimed range of 181 km.

Treo, Treo Yaari and Treo Zor

In Nov 2018, Mahindra Electric launched the Treo range of three-wheelers, powered by Lithium-ion technology. The range consists of the Treo, electric auto and Treo Yaari, electric rickshaw. The Treo auto boasts an ARAI-certified driving range of 170 km and has a typical driving range of 130 km on the Mahindra Treo after 3 hours 50 minutes of charging. The certified range on the Treo Yaari is 130 km that can hit a typical driving range of 85 km after 2 hours 30 minutes of charging. Both have a direct drive transmission type, and the Treo has a peak power of 5.4 kW and a peak torque of 30 Nm. The Treo Yaari has a peak power of 1.96 kW and a peak torque of 19 Nm.

Both the Treo and the Treo Yaari have a wheelbase of 2050 mm and a turning radius of 2.9 m. The Treo range has a vehicle kerb weight between 340–350 kg, while the Treo Yaari range has a vehicle kerb weight between 265–275 kg.

Mahindra Electric recently signed an MoU with TWU (Three Wheels United), a social enterprise providing affordable financing for autorickshaw drivers and Smart E for supplying a total of 2,000 Treo units in 2020.

XUV400 
Mahindra unvieled XUV400 electric is unvield on 8th September 2022 which is based on Mahindra XUV300 The new Mahindra Twin Peaks logo, reserved for Sport Utility Vehicles, is used but in copper and also unvield XUV400 Special Edition in November 2022, Mahindra claims a range of 456km on a single charge as per Indian driving cycle (MIDC). When plugged into a 50kW DC fast charger, the batteries can be charged from 0-80 percent within 50 minutes. When charged via a 7.2 kW/32A outlet, it takes 6 hours 30 minutes for 0-100 percent charge while the same is achieved in 13 hours when using a standard 3.3 kW/16A domestic socket.

The Mahindra XUV400 also features three driving modes - Fun, Fast and Fearless - that adjusts the steering and throttle response as well as the level of regenarative braking. Mahindra claims that the XUV400 is capable of single pedal driving where the regenarative braking takes care of the deceleration. And it will launch in early 2023.

Born Electric
Born Electric  is an Electric SUV Sub Brand Under Indian Automobile manufacturer Mahindra

Future 

Prior to the Mahindra acquisition, Reva had partnered with Bannon Automotive to set up an assembly plant in upstate New York to produce the NXR for the US market.

In 2014, Reva displayed an all-electric sports car concept called Halo. It is claimed to reach 0–100 km/h under 8 sec with a top speed of 160 km/h and range of over 200 km in one full range. The Halo boasts a large tablet on the centre console that displays various car functions in real-time and doubles up as a multimedia player.

In 2018, Mahindra showed a concept for a small electric quadricycle called the Atom, with the production version of this auto-rickshaw based 4 wheeler shown at the 2020 Auto Expo. Like the REVAi/G-Wiz the quadricycle will be built in Bengaluru and will join larger EV models like the Mahindra eXUV300 and eKUV100 in the company's range sometime in 2021.

In 2022, Mahindra unvield a 5 electric vehicles With 2 brand name XUV and BE. XUV unveiled 2 electric cars which is XUV.e8 and XUV.e9 and BE also unvield 3 electric cars which is BE.05, BE.07 and BE.09 in Mahindra Advanced Design Europe (MADE) at Oxfordshire United Kingdom and also unvield BE RALL-E at Hyderabad on 11th February 2023.

Mahindra Electric and Formula E

Formula E car was showcased by Mahindra Electric, as a part of the Mahindra Group in the 2014 Auto Expo at Delhi. Mahindra Electric team worked closely with the Mahindra Racing, the racing division of Mahindra Group, to get the Formula E cars ready for the first race of the inaugural FIA Formula E Championship, which took place at Beijing in September 2014. Mahindra Racing Team is the only Indian team to race in the Inaugural Formula E championship. Following a successful first-ever Formula E race in Beijing, Mahindra Racing explored the possibility of bringing the electrically-powered car series to India in the 2016-2017 season.

Besides creating a mark on the global e-racing scene, the knowledge and technology from such Formula E cars will be used for commercial electric 
cars  with performance characteristics usually seen in cars with high-performance internal combustion engines.

See also
Electric vehicle industry in India

References

External links

Vehicle manufacturing companies established in 1994
Car manufacturers of India
Battery electric vehicle manufacturers
Mahindra Group
Manufacturing companies based in Bangalore
Electric vehicle manufacturers of India
Car brands
1994 establishments in Karnataka
Indian companies established in 1994